Cho So-hyun (born 24 June 1988) is a South Korean footballer who plays as a midfielder for the Women's Super League side Tottenham Hotspur and the South Korean national team. She is widely regarded as one of South Korea's finest ever players, and is their second most capped international player with 142 appearances. Cho was the number 1 pick in the 2009 WK-League draft, signing for Suwon FMC. She has won multiple domestic league titles and was named Korean Women's Player of the Year in 2015.

Club career

Hyundai Steel Red Angels
On 20 November 2017, Cho scored twice in a 3–0 win over Hwacheon KSPO in the second leg of the WK League final. She finished the 2017 season with three goals and two assists in 27 appearances and won her fourth league title.

Loan to INAC Kobe Leonessa
On 29 January 2016, Cho joined INAC Kobe Leonessa on loan and was given the number 16 shirt. On 26 March, she made her debut in a 3–1 win over Konomiya Speranza Osaka-Takatsuki. On 11 June, she scored twice in a 6–0 away victory against Konomiya Speranza Osaka-Takatsuki in the Nadeshiko League Cup. On 25 December, she converted a penalty in INAC Kobe Leonessa's penalty shootout win over Albirex Niigata in the 2016 Empress's Cup Final, helping the club to its sixth Empress's Cup title. Cho finished the season with two goals in 27 appearances in all competitions. On 12 January 2017, it was announced that Cho had returned to Hyundai Steel Red Angels.

Avaldsnes IL
On 7 February 2018, Cho signed a one-year contract with Avaldsnes IL, becoming the first South Korean woman to play in Norway. On 22 April 2018, she made her debut in a 3–0 loss to Vålerenga. With Cho, Avaldsnes IL reached the round of 32 in the 2017–18 UEFA Women's Champions League.

West Ham United

In December 2018, South Korean media reported that Cho had signed for West Ham United of the English FA Women's Super League. Cho So-hyun was officially announced as a West Ham player on 13 January 2019 via the club website where she was quoted as saying "It's always been my ambition to play in England, so this is a very exciting time for me. It's a big league, and to be signing for a big club like West Ham with all the history, makes it even more special." Cho made her debut on the same day coming on as a second-half substitute against title challengers Manchester City.

In February 2019, Cho provided both assists for Alisha Lehmann as West Ham beat Reading 2–1.

Cho made her Women's FA Cup debut on 3 February 2019 in a 3–1 home victory over Blackburn Rovers. On 14 April 2019 West Ham reached their first FA Cup final by defeating Reading after a penalty shoot-out. With the scoreline deadlocked at 1–1, Cho scored the decisive penalty to send West Ham to Wembley.

On 6 July 2020, Cho signed a new two-year contract with West Ham.

Tottenham Hotspur
On 28 January 2021, Cho joined the FA WSL side Tottenham Hotspur on loan for the remainder of the 2020–21 season, with an option to make the loan permanent. With her men's counterpart Son Heung-min already at the club, it gave Spurs the rare distinction of having both the men's and women's South Korean national team captains at one club.

Spurs announced Cho had officially signed for the club on 2 July 2021. She scored her first goal for Spurs and her first ever goal in England on 17 November 2021 in their League Cup tie against Watford.

International career
Cho captained South Korea at the 2015 FIFA Women's World Cup in Canada. In their final group match Cho scored a vital equaliser against Spain. They would go on to win the match and finish second in their group which saw them qualify for the knockout stages. It was the first time South Korea had progressed to the round of 16. In 2015, she was named the KFA Footballer of the Year. In April 2018 Cho scored twice against the Philippines at the 2018 AFC Women's Asian Cup, a win which saw South Korea qualify for the 2019 FIFA Women's World Cup. On 17 May 2019, Cho was officially announced in the 2019 World Cup squad and would again captain the team. Despite South Korea losing their second group stage match to Nigeria, Cho was statistically the best player on the pitch according to football analytics site Twelve Football. In September 2021 Cho scored twice in a 12–0 victory over Mongolia in the Asian Cup qualifiers.

On 30 January 2022, Cho made her 137th appearance for South Korea in a 1–0 victory over Australia at the 2022 AFC Women's Asian Cup and became the most capped South Korean footballer in the country's history.

She scored her 23rd international goal on 3 February 2022, the opener in a 2–0 win over the Philippines. That victory saw South Korea reach the final of the AFC Women's Asian Cup for the first time in history.

Personal life 
In an interview with British journalist Drew Diamond, Cho revealed that amongst her many ambitions in life is to become a general manager of a women's football club in her native South Korea.

Alongside fellow South Korean and Spurs footballer Son Heung-min, Cho is an ambassador for AIA Group where she promotes healthy living. Like Son, Cho also has a sponsorship deal with sportswear and equipment supplier Adidas.

Career statistics

Club

International
Scores and results list South Korea's goal tally first, score column indicates score after each Cho goal.

Honours

Suwon FMC
WK League: 2010

Incheon Hyundai Steel Red Angels
WK League: 2013, 2014, 2015, 2017

INAC Kobe Leonessa
 Empress's Cup: 2016

West Ham United
 Women's FA Cup Finalist: 2018–19

South Korea
 Summer Universiade Gold medal: 2009
 Asian Games Bronze medal: 2014
 Four Nations Tournament runner-up: 2019
 AFC Women's Asian Cup Finalist: 2022

Individual
 KFA Footballer of the Year: 2015

References

External links
 
 

1988 births
Living people
Footballers from Seoul
South Korean women's footballers
South Korea women's under-17 international footballers
South Korea women's under-20 international footballers
South Korea women's international footballers
Women's association football midfielders
Suwon FC Women players
Incheon Hyundai Steel Red Angels WFC players
INAC Kobe Leonessa players
West Ham United F.C. Women players
Tottenham Hotspur F.C. Women players
WK League players
Nadeshiko League players
Toppserien players
Women's Super League players
South Korean expatriate footballers
South Korean expatriate sportspeople in Japan
Expatriate women's footballers in Japan
South Korean expatriate sportspeople in Norway
Expatriate women's footballers in Norway
South Korean expatriate sportspeople in England
Expatriate women's footballers in England
Universiade gold medalists for South Korea
Universiade medalists in football
FIFA Century Club
Footballers at the 2014 Asian Games
Footballers at the 2018 Asian Games
Asian Games bronze medalists for South Korea
Asian Games medalists in football
Medalists at the 2014 Asian Games
Medalists at the 2018 Asian Games
2015 FIFA Women's World Cup players
2019 FIFA Women's World Cup players
Medalists at the 2009 Summer Universiade